Concatenation is a computer programming operation that joins strings together.

Concatenation may also refer to:
 Concatenation (architecture), an architectural composition
 Concatenation of paths, a construction in topology
 
 Concatenated SMS, a way of combining multiple SMS text messages sent to cellular phones
 Packet concatenation, a computer networking optimization that coalesces multiple packets under a single header
 cat (Unix), a Unix command to write the contents of one or more files to the standard output
 "Concatenation", the opening track of Swedish extreme metal band Meshuggah's album Chaosphere
 A technical term in Christian liturgy to refer to combining services which are normally performed at different times of the day

See also
 Catenation, the chemical bonding of atoms of the same element into a chain